is a binary trans-Neptunian object from the Kuiper belt, located in the outermost region of the Solar System. It was discovered on 4 May 2011, by a team of astronomers using one of the Magellan Telescopes in Chile during the New Horizons KBO Search for a potential flyby target for the New Horizons spacecraft. The discovery adds support to streaming instability as the dominant mechanism in the formation of tight and contact binary planetesimals such as 486958 Arrokoth, which appear to be prevalent in the cold classical Kuiper belt population.

Numbering and naming 
This minor planet has not been numbered by the Minor Planet Center and remains unnamed.

See also 
 , another tight binary KBO observed by New Horizons
 List of New Horizons topics

References

External links 
 DPS 53 Wednesday Press Conference (Tight Twins in the Kuiper Belt presentation by Hal Weaver), AAS Press Office, YouTube, 6 October 2021
 DPS 53: Days 3, 4, and 5, Kerry Hensley, AAS Nova, 9 October 2021
 List of Transneptunian Objects, Minor Planet Center
 
 

Minor planet object articles (unnumbered)

New Horizons

20110504